Daniel Lascelles (1714–1784) was an  plantation owner, merchant and politician who sat in the British House of Commons  from 1752 to 1780. 

Born in Barbados and baptised at St Michael's, 20 May 1714 he resided at Goldsborough Hall near Knaresborough Yorkshire which estate he purchased about 1756.

The second son of Henry Lascelles (1690–1753) and his first wife, Mary Carter he represented the constituency of Northallerton from 3 April 1752, succeeding his father, to 1780 when he stood down in favour of his elder brother Edwin (1713-1795) who later became 1st Baron Harewood.

He was a partner in the firm of Lascelles and Maxwell, sugar factors, of Mark Lane, London; which, following the death of George Maxwell in 1763 became Lascelles Clarke and Daling.

Daniel married Elizabeth Southwick from whom he was divorced in 1751. He had no legitimate children. He died in Pall Mall London 24 May 1784.

References

1714 births
1784 deaths
Colony of Barbados people
West Indies merchants
British MPs 1747–1754
British MPs 1754–1761
British MPs 1761–1768
British MPs 1768–1774
British MPs 1774–1780
Daniel
Members of the Parliament of Great Britain for English constituencies
People from the Borough of Harrogate
British slave owners